Takeo Shiina (May 11, 1929 - ) is a Japanese business executive who contributed to the IT industry of the world as well as of Japan.

Birth and Education
Takeo "Tak" Shiina was born in Seki, Gifu, Japan. His parents, originally from Tokyo, managed a ceramics plant at that time. Tak spent his elementary school days there, but studied at the middle and high schools attached to Keio University in Tokyo.

He had a BS in engineering from Keio University's Engineering School in March 1951, and then studied at Bucknell University, Pennsylvania, United States, receiving another BS degree in mechanical engineering in 1953.

IBM's Japanese Subsidiary
Upon his return to Japan in 1953, Shiina started to work for the Japanese subsidiary of IBM Corporation, in the manufacturing department, actually a small assembly facility near Haneda Airport. He became the manager of IBM's Chidoricho Plant in 1960, and then the head of IBM Japan's manufacturing department. After working as heads of Personnel, Marketing and Finance departments, he was appointed as President of IBM Japan, Ltd., in 1975.

During his tenure as President, IBM Japan experienced phenomenal growth during this time of IBM System/360 and System/370 computers, in spite of large import tax for imported high-tech products and the stiff competition with the three Japanese mainframe computer groups (Fujitsu-Hitachi, NEC-Toshiba, and Mitsubishi Electric-Oki) that Japan's Ministry of International Trade and Industry had arranged and subsidized. IBM eventually registered an annual revenue of 1,000,000,000,000 yen, showing an unheard-of success of a foreign company in Japan, where foreign companies were barred to again any significant business in the post-World War II period.

In 1993, he became chairperson of IBM Japan as Kakutaro Kitashiro became president. In 1999, he became the supreme adviser as Kitashiro was appointed as chairperson and Takuma Otoshi as president.

For Japan's Industries
Shiina contributed to the Japanese business world as a life-time member of the influential Japan Association of Corporate Executives. He was also Vice Chairman, Board of Council, and Chairman, Committee of Foreign Affiliated Corporation, Japan Federation of Economic Organizations. His interest was in the productivity of both employees and executives, and was vice president of Japan Productivity Center. He was on the boards of directors of Hoya Corporation, Mitsui O.S.K. Lines, Meiji Seika and Mercian Corporation.

For Asia-Pacific and the World
Shiina also contributed to the IT industry of Asia Pacific as a member of the board of IBM World Trade Asia/Pacific Corporation. From 1989-93, he also served as vice president of IBM Corporation during the most difficult time of IBM. He contributed for IBM to realize the growth potential of the Asia Pacific region, and is quoted as saying, "I sell IBM to Japan, but I sell Japan to IBM".

Recognition
In 1990, Takeo Shiina received the Purple Ribbon of Honor of the Japanese Government. In 1994, the Prime Minister of Japan recognized Shiina's contributions to his country's international trade policy development with a Trade Award. In 2003, he was awarded the Grand Cordon of the Order of the Sacred Treasure, Japan's highest decoration, by the Emperor in 2000.

In 2008, Shiina received Outstanding Contribution Award from his alma mater, Bucknell University.

Publication
In 2001, Shiina was invited to write an autobiography in a series of articles in the "My Curriculum Vitae" column of the Nihon Keizai Shimbun, where Louis V. Gerstner Jr. also participated in 1992. Shiina's autobiography was later made a book, "Living with Foreign Companies in Japan", in Japanese.

References

External links
Takeo Shiina (IBM Corporation, October, 1993)
Takeo Shiina (Bloomberg)

Japanese chief executives
IBM employees
Keio University alumni
People from Gifu Prefecture
1934 births
Bucknell University alumni
Living people